Thomas Busby may refer to:

 Thomas Busby (soldier) (1735–1798), Irish soldier
 Thomas Busby (composer) (1755–1838), English composer
 Thomas Lord Busby (1782–1838), English painter and engraver 
 T. Jeff Busby (1884–1964), U.S. Representative from Mississippi
 Thomas Busby, Australian singer, songwriter and musician for blues and roots duo Busby Marou
 Thomas Busby, Australian guitarist, songwriter, and musician for rock band Luca Brasi
 Thomas Busby, the murderer alleged to have cursed a haunted chair

See also
 Tom Busby (1936–2003), Canadian actor